The 10 kilometre cross-country skiing event was part of the cross-country skiing programme at the 1960 Winter Olympics, in Squaw Valley, California, United States. It was the third appearance of the event. The competition was held on Saturday, February 20, 1960, at the McKinney Creek Stadium.

It was a Soviet Union clean sweep of the medals with Maria Gusakova winning gold and defending champion Lyubov Kozyreva taking silver. In fact the Soviets also took fourth place through Alevtina Kolchina.

Two days later, Gusakova's husband, Nikolay Gusakov won bronze in the Nordic Combined.

Results

References

External links
1960 Squaw Valley Official Olympic Report

Women's cross-country skiing at the 1960 Winter Olympics
Women's 10 kilometre cross-country skiing at the Winter Olympics
Oly
Cross